Denis Pigott (born 1946) is an Australian equestrian. He won a bronze medal in team eventing at the 1976 Summer Olympics in Montreal, and placed 20th in individual eventing.

References

1946 births
Living people
Australian male equestrians
Olympic equestrians of Australia
Olympic bronze medalists for Australia
Equestrians at the 1976 Summer Olympics
Olympic medalists in equestrian
Place of birth missing (living people)
Medalists at the 1976 Summer Olympics
20th-century Australian people